Kurniawan Kartika Ajie (born 20 June 1996) is an Indonesian professional footballer who plays as a goalkeeper for Liga 1  club Persik Kediri.

Club career

Persiba Balikpapan
In 2016, Kurniawan promotion to senior team of Persiba Balikpapan in 2016 Indonesia Soccer Championship A. He quickly rose as the team's starting goalkeeper, appearing in 11 matches in two seasons Indonesia Soccer Championship A and Liga 1.

Arema FC
In 2018, Ajie signed a contract with Indonesian Liga 1 club Arema. He made his league debut on 24 March 2018 in a match against Mitra Kukar at the Kanjuruhan Stadium, Malang.

RANS Cilegon (loan)
He was signed for RANS Cilegon to play in Liga 2, on loan form Liga 1 club Arema. Kartika Ajie made his league debut on 5 October 2021 in a match against Persekat Tegal at the Gelora Bung Karno Madya Stadium, Jakarta.

Barito Putera (loan)
In January 2022, Ajie signed a contract with Liga 1 club Barito Putera on loan from Arema. He made his league debut in a 2–0 loss against Borneo on 14 January 2022 at the Kompyang Sujana Stadium, Denpasar.

Persik Kediri
Kartika Ajie was signed for Persik Kediri to play in Liga 1 in the 2022–23 season. He made his league debut on 19 August 2022 in a match against PSIS Semarang at the Jatidiri Stadium, Semarang.

Career statistics

Club

Honours

Club 
Arema
 Indonesia President's Cup: 2019
RANS Cilegon
 Liga 2 runner-up: 2021

International 
Indonesia U-23
 Southeast Asian Games  Bronze medal: 2017
Indonesia
 Aceh World Solidarity Cup runner-up: 2017

Individual 
 East Kalimantan Governor Cup Best Young Player: 2018

References

External links
 
 Kurniawan Ajie at Liga Indonesia

Living people
1996 births
Indonesian footballers
People from Balikpapan
Persiba Balikpapan players
Arema F.C. players
RANS Nusantara F.C. players
PS Barito Putera players
Persik Kediri players 
Liga 1 (Indonesia) players
Liga 2 (Indonesia) players
Sportspeople from East Kalimantan
Indonesia youth international footballers
Association football goalkeepers
Southeast Asian Games bronze medalists for Indonesia
Southeast Asian Games medalists in football
Competitors at the 2017 Southeast Asian Games